Khlevensky District is an administrative and municipal district (raion), one of the eighteen in Lipetsk Oblast, Russia. It is located in the south of the oblast. Its administrative center is the rural locality (a selo) of Khlevnoye. Population:  22,251 (2002 Census);  The population of Khlevnoye accounts for 29.5% of the district's total population.

References

Notes

Sources

Districts of Lipetsk Oblast